The Sony Xperia L1 is an Android smartphone manufactured by Sony Mobile Communications. It was announced in March 2017 and was released in June 2017.

Specifications

Hardware 
The device features a  720p screen.

The rear-facing camera of the Xperia L1 is 13 megapixels. The front facing camera is 5MP.

Software 
The Xperia L1 is preinstalled with Android 7.0 Nougat with Sony's custom interface and software.

References

External links 

Android (operating system) devices
Sony smartphones